Grzegorz Hajdarowicz (born 27 October 1965) is a Polish entrepreneur, film producer, publisher (acting through his company Gremi Media), honorary consul of the Federative Republic of Brazil in Kraków. Participant of the international Bilderberg meeting in 2018.

Education 
Hajdarowicz graduated from the Institute of Political Science at the Faculty of Law of the Jagiellonian University in Kraków. He received a Master's Degree in Political Science.

Business career 
Hajdarowicz created his first company, Gremi in 1991. Currently, together with its related companies, Gremi focuses on equity investments, restructuring and real estate projects. Hajdarowicz is the main shareholder of Gremi corporate group (99%) which controls, among others, the KCI S.A listed company.

In 2009 Hajdarowicz has invested in a real estate project “Eco Estrela” in Brazil by buying Fazenda Estrela with an area of 25 square kilometres and 6.5 kilometres of beach. For this project, in 2017 Hajdarowicz signed a partnership agreement with Six Senses, a company specializing in the management of luxury hotels, resorts and spas.

Also in 2009, with the purchase of the Przekrój weekly, Hajdarowicz founded Gremi Media SA. In the following years, the company specialized as a publisher of printed and electronic media for the financial, law and business sectors. Currently, Gremi Media S.A. is a leading media group in Poland, the publisher of the "Rzeczpospolita", "Parkiet" and "Sport" dailies, the monthly magazine "Uważam Rze Historia" the websites rp.pl, tv.rp.pl, parkiet.com, sportdziennik.com, and historia.uwazamrze.pl. In December 2021, 40% of Gremi Media's shares were purchased by the Dutch fund Pluralis B.V. Through its investors, Media Development Investment Fund (MDIF) and Soros Economic Development Fund (SEDF), Pluralis B.V.is supported by George Soros.

In 2017 he acquired Alvernia Studios.

For a few years, within a separate business line, Grzegorz Hajdarowicz has been involved in film production through Gremi Film. He has produced 6 feature films since 2003, 3 Polish productions: Zakochany Anioł (2005) Pod powierzchnią (2006), Hania (2007), and 3 international movies: Nightwatching (2007, dir. Peter Greenaway), Carmo, Hit the Road (2008, dir. Murilo Pasta), City Island (2009, dir. Raymond De Felitta).

Film awards 
City Island - Tribeca Film Festiwal's Audience Award in New York.

Carmo - 25th Sundace Film Festival selection.

Orders 
Order of Polonia Restituta, the Knight's Cross (2015)

Order of Rio Branco, Officer (2020)

Cross of Freedom and Solidarity (2021)

References

External links 
 Interview with Grzegorz Hajdarowicz in "American Investor" (Spring 2017, p. 20-21)
 Grzegorz Hajdarowicz at IMDb.com
 Website of the Gremi Group's EcoEstrela Project in Brasil

1965 births
Living people
Jagiellonian University alumni
Polish film producers
Recipients of Cross of Freedom and Solidarity